was a town located in Kojima District, Okayama Prefecture, Japan.

As of 2003, the town had an estimated population of 15,872 and a density of 514.32 persons per km2. The total area was 30.86 km2.

On March 22, 2005, Nadasaki, along with the town of Mitsu (from Mitsu District), was merged into the expanded city of Okayama.

Dissolved municipalities of Okayama Prefecture